The 2012 Women's Kirin Challenge Cup was an association football tournament organized in Japan. It was held from 1–5 April 2012 in Japan and included 3 teams: Brazil, Japan and the United States. Japan won the tournament on goals scored after tying with the United States and beating Brazil 4–1.

Results

References

Brazil National Team All Matches

Kirin Cup
Kirin
Kirin
Kirin
Kirin
2012